The Confessions of the Green Mask is a 1916 German silent film directed by Max Mack and starring Alfred Abel and Reinhold Schünzel.

The film's sets were designed by the art director Heinrich Richter.

Cast
Alfred Abel
Reinhold Schünzel
Maria Orska
Paul Otto

References

External links

Films of the German Empire
German silent feature films
Films directed by Max Mack
German black-and-white films
1910s German films